Early Hours is Eleanor McEvoy's fifth studio album. Its style differs from her previous work with its collection of songs incorporating many musical styles including folk, jazz and blues. The album has McEvoy on vocals, guitar and fiddle. The album's co-producer, Brian Connor, accompanies her on piano, Hammond and a variety of keyboards. Also on the album are the drummer/percussionist Liam Bradley, Calum McColl on guitar, the bass guitarist Nicky Scott and Lindley Hamilton on trumpet. Early Hours was the first album to use TiMax (unique audio imaging) technology, mixed in 5.1 surround sound onto multi-channel super audio compact disc Super Audio Compact Disc (SACD).

Critical reception
According to The Living Tradition, "This is another superbly produced and crafted album from one of Ireland's most accomplished female singer-songwriters - it's a very fine collection crossing over into many musical styles - Celtic, country, folk, jazz and blues - and makes for intensely rewarding listening...... I honestly can't fault this beautifully crafted album."

Track listings

Singles
"Make Mine A Small One"
"I'll Be Willing"
"Days Roll By"

Super audio
Early Hours was released in hybrid CD/SACD format, with multi-channel surround mix.

Vinyl
Early Hours (MOSV101) was released on vinyl in 2004 by Mosco Vinyl

Awards
Early Hours was voted Best Contemporary Album 2004-2005 by Irish Music Magazine Readers Poll.

References

2004 albums
Eleanor McEvoy albums